Navar (also Romanized as Nāvar, Nāver, and Nāvor) is a village in Chaldoran-e Jonubi Rural District, in the Central District of Chaldoran County, West Azerbaijan Province, Iran. At the 2006 census, its population was 560, in 108 families.

Name 
According to Vladimir Minorsky, the name Nāvur is derived from the Mongolian language and means "a lake".

References 

Populated places in Chaldoran County